The Institute of Science & Advanced Research (ISAR) is a self-financed undergraduate science degree college, affiliated to the West Bengal State University, Barasat, North 24 Parganas (formerly belong to University of Calcutta) established by the B. P. Poddar Foundation for Education in 2007 with its mentor Badri Prasad Poddar. The institute caters to Biotechnology, Genetics, Healthcare, Microbiology and R & D activities. The focus is on the research and developmental activities with special emphasis on education and industry partnership in the fields of agriculture, health, healthcare, food, processing and preservation and environment.

Location

The campus is at the prime location of 46, Manujendra Dutta Road, Gorabazar, Dum Dum Cantonment, Kolkata – 700028, close to Kolkata Airport and Nager bazaar crossing. It is well connected to rail and bus routes.

Courses offered

 Biochemistry (Hons.)
 Computer Science (Hons.)
Environmental Science (Hons.)
Food & Nutrition (Hons.)
Microbiology (Hons.)

See also
Education in India
List of colleges in West Bengal
Education in West Bengal

References

External links
 Official website of B P Poddar Group
 B. P. Poddar Group | DPS - Kashi
 Wikimapia: B.P.PODDAR ISAR COLLEGE
 List of Colleges under West Bengal State University

Educational institutions established in 2007
2007 establishments in West Bengal
Colleges affiliated to West Bengal State University